Anya Taranda (January 1, 1915 – March 9, 1970)  was an American model, showgirl, and actress and the wife of composer Harold Arlen.

Biography
Born in New York City to Catholic Russian parents, Anya Taranda became a Powers Agency model where she was signed as one of the original Breck Shampoo models. In 1932, she met composer Harold Arlen in New York City during the Broadway theatre production of Earl Carroll's Vanities. They eventually married on January 6, 1937, over the objection of their parents, because she was a Gentile and he was Jewish.

In 1934 she appeared in her first of nine film roles, in an uncredited part as an "Earl Carroll girl" in Murder at the Vanities, based on Carroll's Broadway play. 

In 1951 she was institutionalized in a sanatorium for seven years after repeatedly threatening her husband and others with physical harm.

She died from a brain tumor, in New York City, at the age of 55. She is interred next to her husband in the Ferncliff Cemetery in Hartsdale, New York.

References

External links

1915 births
1970 deaths
Female models from New York (state)
American film actresses
American people of Russian descent
Burials at Ferncliff Cemetery
20th-century American actresses
Deaths from cancer in New York (state)
Deaths from brain cancer in the United States